Hot Blood Dance Crew  is an original Chinese reality street dance variety show produced by iQiyi. The show was officially aired and broadcast online on March 17, 2018 on iQiyi.

Concept 
Hot Blood Dance Crew brings together 191 dancers from all walks of life, both within and beyond China, including individual trainees who aren't associated with any agencies and they battle it out to be the best dancers in China.

Mentors 
The mentor teams are Luhan & Jackson and William & Victoria.

Notable contestants 

Meng Jia (孟佳)
 Su Lianya (苏恋雅)
 X-Crew Members (AK(阿K),SUTA(秦煜))
 Xiao Jie (肖杰) "Locking Jay"
 Young-G (养鸡)
 Cao Yu (草鱼) "Caster Yu"
 Jun Liu (劉隽) 1Million Dance Studio
 Liu Yuxin (刘雨昕)
 Huang Xiao (Hello Dance)

Rounds 
Round 1: Casting
The 191 dancers are stationed around the city. The two teams of mentors, Jackson & Luhan and William & Victoria, must go around using a map of where each crew is to cast dancers. Each team only has 30 spots.

Round 2: Ranking
Within each team dancers must rank themselves from 1-30. They enter one by one, if someone is sitting in the number spot they want, the two do a freestyle battle for it.

Round 3: 1 v. 1 Battle
One by one, starting at number 1, choose an opponent on the same team to do a choreography with. Their team mentor must then eliminate one of them.

Round 4: Group Dance
As a team the remaining 15 dancers must choreograph a 3 minute routine, in 48 hours under the concept ‘Brothers’. Before the performance each team must eliminate 3 people. Within this round team leaders ranked their contestants, the losing team must automatically eliminate their last place member.

Round 5: Bottom 3 survival
The contestants ranked in the bottom 3 must battle with the other team’s bottom 3. Each member is allowed to choose one person not in the bottom 3 to dance with them, making it a 2 v. 2 battle. The losing member of the bottom 3 must leave. 
Example; #10 teams up with #2 and they battle #10 and #4 from the other team. If the 10/2 team loses, #10 must leave. The special guests in this round include Galen Hooks and Rie Hata.

Round 6: Singer’s Collaboration
Each individual mentor randomly chooses a number. That number is the number of people that will perform with a singer of the mentor’s choice. The possible numbers are 1, 5, 7 and 8. They perform against the other team and the losing team must eliminate one member.
This round is decided by the votes of 99 dancers.

Round 7: Revival
The mentors from each team have chosen 3 people from their team that were previously eliminated that they want back. Each revival member gets to choose a current member of their team to represent them in a free style battle against another revival member’s representative. The winning representative then saves their revival member. This round is decided by the votes of 99 dancers.

Round 7.5: Revival Pt. 2 
The surviving revival members must choose a current member from the opposing team to battle against using a prepared choreography. The loser is automatically eliminated, whether they are a current or surviving revival member. This round is decided by the votes of 99 dancers.

Round 8: Subunit Themes
Each individual mentor has chosen a theme, making it 4 themes. Each team must create a subunit to dance to each theme, no subunit can have the same number of members. The themes given are ‘It’s just strong’, ‘Time control’, ‘Pink’ and ‘Butterfly Effect’. This round is decided by the votes of 99 dancers. The total number of votes throughout the 4 rounds are counted. The team with more overall votes win. The losing team must eliminate 3 team members.

Round 9: Iron Man battle
One by one members enter into a free style battle with a member from the opposing team. The loser of the battle is sent to side and another team member takes their place. While the winner of the battle stays to battle the next member, when all teammates from one side have been defeated it’s considered a win for the other team. This round is decided by the votes of 99 dancers.

International broadcast 
 Malaysia Astro TV
 iQiYi
 HTV (Vietnam) - Sàn đấu vũ đạo

Reception 
Hot Blood Dance Crew was an immense hit in China, receiving over 1.8 billion views on its final episode; topics relating to the show on Chinese microblogging site Sina Weibo also received over 20 billion views. Additionally, as one of the year's most followed and discussed Chinese programs, it broke advertising revenue records across the online entertainment industry.

References 

Chinese music television series
Mandopop
2018 Chinese television series debuts
Chinese television shows
Mandarin-language television shows
2018 Chinese television series endings